Huotian Town is an urban town in Chaling County, Hunan Province, People's Republic of China.

Cityscape
The town is divided into 14 villages and 1 community, the following areas: Huotian Community, Wumen Village, Beishui Village, Xinhua Village, Lianxi Village, Miaobei Village, Mafu Village, Beijiang Village, Gushi Village, Shantian Village, Fujiang Village, Zhoubei Village, Fengjing Village, Zhangchong Village, and Shaxia Village.

References

External links

Divisions of Chaling County